The discography of Skye Sweetnam, a Canadian singer-songwriter, consists of two studio albums and five singles. By 2007, she had sold approximately 160,000 albums worldwide and 154,000 singles digital downloads in the United States. Her debut album spawned two hit singles in Canada and sold well in Japan, where it was Top 15 and stayed on chart for 21 weeks.

Studio albums

Singles

Music videos

References

Discographies of Canadian artists
Discography